The  is a railway line in Saitama Prefecture, Japan, operated by Seibu Railway. It is an extension of the Seibu Ikebukuro Line, and connects Agano Station and Seibu-Chichibu Station.

Stations
All trains go via Agano Station to the Seibu Ikebukuro line. Abbreviations here are for the table below, not formally used.

  Stops at all stations.

  (RE)

History
The entire line was opened on October 14, 1969, after over two years of construction, considerably shortening the travel time between Chichibu and Tokyo. Twenty years later, on April 1, 1989, a connection opened to the Chichibu Railway's Chichibu Main Line, and through service began. On March 28, 1996, freight services between Higashi-Yokoze freight terminal and Shin-Akitsu (on the Seibu Ikebukuro Line) ceased. On March 12, 2003, "wanman" (one man) driver only operation began.

References

 
Chichibu Line
Rail transport in Saitama Prefecture
1067 mm gauge railways in Japan
Railway lines opened in 1969